Helmut Schäfer (October 22, 1908 – July 30, 1994) was a German weightlifter who competed in the 1932 Summer Olympics. He was born in Stuttgart. In 1932 he finished fourth in the featherweight class.

External links

1908 births
1994 deaths
Sportspeople from Stuttgart
German male weightlifters
Olympic weightlifters of Germany
Weightlifters at the 1932 Summer Olympics
World record setters in weightlifting
20th-century German people